Astrid Lulling (born 11 June 1929, in Schifflange) is a politician in Luxembourg. She was a Member of the European Parliament (1965–1974 and 1989–2014) for the Christian Social People's Party, part of the European People's Party.

Positions held 
	Member of the Parliament's Bureau.
	Member of the Quaestors.
	Member of the Committee on Economic and Monetary Affairs.
	Member of the Committee on Women's Rights and Gender Equality.
	Member of the Delegation for relations with the countries of Central America.
	Member of the Delegation to the Euro-Latin American Parliamentary Assembly.
	Substitute of the Committee on Agriculture and Rural Development.
	Substitute of the Delegation for relations with the countries of Southeast Asia and the Association of Southeast Asian Nations (ASEAN).

Curriculum vitae 

 Studied political economy at the University of Saarbrücken (1953–1955).

 Secretary and editor of the Luxembourg Workers' Union (1949–1963).

 Worked for the Miners and Metalworkers Contact Office with the ECSC, Luxembourg (1950–1958).

 Chairwoman of Socialist Women, Luxembourg Socialist Workers' Party (1963–1971).

 Member of the Social Democratic Party (PSD) executive committee (1971–1982).

 Member and Vice-Chairwoman of the Luxembourg-Centre section of the PCS (1984–2004).

 Member of the National Christian Social Women's Committee (since 1984).

 Secretary-General of the Unions of Agricultural Workers and of Food Industry Workers, at the European Community Trade Union Secretariat in Brussels (1963–1971).

 Member of Schifflange communal council (1970–2000).

 Mayor of Schifflange (1970–1985).

 Chairwoman of the PSD parliamentary group in the Chamber of Deputies (1974–1979).

 Member of the Bureau of the Chamber of Deputies (1984–1988).

 Member of the Consumers' Consultative Committee, European Commission (1974–1982).

 Member of the European Parliament (1965–1974 and 1989–2014).

Decorations
 Commander of the Order of Merit of the Republic (Italy)
 Grand Officer of the Order of Merit of the Grand Duchy of Luxembourg (Luxembourg)
 Grand Officer of the Order of the Oak Crown (Luxembourg)

Other Informations
 Mrs Lulling is the author with her grand nephew Jerome of a luxembourgish video course for foreigners interested in the Luxembourg national language.
 One of her former assistants, Christophe Hansen (politician) stood as candidate in the 2014 European elections for the Christian Social People's Party.

External links 

 AstridLulling.com - the official site
 Astrid Lulling TV - TV Shows with Astrid Lulling on Google Video
 Luxdico.com - luxembourgish dictionary. Patronage: Astrid Lulling
 Strasbourg loses allure as 'shuttle democracy' host - Astrid Lulling in the Financial Times (5/15/05)

MEPs for Luxembourg 2004–2009
Members of the Chamber of Deputies (Luxembourg)
Councillors in Schifflange
Christian Social People's Party politicians
Social Democratic Party (Luxembourg) politicians
Luxembourg Socialist Workers' Party politicians
Women mayors of places in Luxembourg
1929 births
Living people
People from Schifflange
Christian Social People's Party MEPs
21st-century women MEPs for Luxembourg
20th-century women MEPs for Luxembourg
MEPs for Luxembourg 1989–1994
MEPs for Luxembourg 1994–1999
MEPs for Luxembourg 1999–2004
MEPs for Luxembourg 2009–2014
Commanders of the Order of Merit of the Italian Republic
Grand Officers of the Order of Merit of the Grand Duchy of Luxembourg
Officers of the Order of Merit of the Grand Duchy of Luxembourg